João Henrique de Andrade Lima Campos (born 26 November 1993) is a Brazilian politician who has been the mayor of Recife since 2021. He was first elected as a federal deputy to the Chamber of Deputies for the state of Pernambuco during the 2018 general election as a member of the Brazilian Socialist Party (PSB). He is the son of former government minister and governor of Pernambuco Eduardo Campos.

Early life
Campos was born on 26 November 1993 in Recife to Eduardo Campos and Renata de Andrade Lima, with Renata having established a career as an economist and state auditor. He comes from a politically prominent family in Pernambuco. In addition to his father, his great-grandfather Miguel Arraes was a long established political figure in Pernambuco. Both his grandmother Ana Arraes and his cousin Marília Arraes have also been federal deputies for Pernambuco state, the latter elected to office in 2018. His father, while campaigning as a presidential candidate during the 2014 presidential election for the PSB, was killed when his plane crashed in poor weather in Santos, São Paulo.

Campos graduated with a degree in civil engineering from the Federal University of Pernambuco in 2016. He began attending university when he was 17, having been approved for graduation from high school in his second year.

Political career
In 2014, Campos was elected secretary of the Pernambuco state branch of the PSB. He coordinated party meetings in the interior of the state. He later became chief of staff of the state of Pernambuco in 2016, a position once held by Campos' father. He served under governor Paulo Câmara. He was responsible for the state government's administrative agenda, as well as event planning and management.

In March 2018, he was elected national vice president of federal relations in the 14th national congress of the PSB. Later that year, during the 2018 general elections, he was elected as a federal deputy for the state of Pernambuco with 460,037 votes, becoming the federal deputy candidate with the most votes in the history of the state. He surpassed both his grandmother Ana Arraes and great-grandfather Miguel Arraes in obtaining this record.

Campos was a candidate in the 2020 Recife mayoral election for the Brazilian Socialist Party. In the first round, he received 29.13% of the vote, going on to win the second round with 56.27% of the vote. He faced his cousin Marília Arraes in the second round, with her representing the Workers' Party. He resigned from his position as a federal deputy on 20 December 2020 in order to take office. At 27, he became the youngest mayor in the city's history.

Personal life
Beginning in 2019, Campos has been in a relationship with fellow Socialist Party member, federal deputy, and education activist Tabata Amaral.

References

External links

1993 births
Living people
Mayors of Recife
Brazilian Socialist Party politicians
Federal University of Pernambuco alumni
Members of the Chamber of Deputies (Brazil) from Pernambuco
Arraes family